Willie Minkah Ajani Clemons (born 24 September 1994) is a professional footballer who plays as a midfielder for National League South club Braintree Town and the Bermuda national team.

Career
Clemons made his international debut against Dominican Republic in June 2016.

On 2 January 2020 Willie Clemons joined Dalkurd FF.

After spending the 2021–22 campaign with Stowmarket Town, Clemons joined National League South side, Braintree Town in August 2022.

International career

International goals
Scores and results list Bermuda's goal tally first.

Career statistics

References

External links

Willie Clemons at Fotbolltransfers

1994 births
Living people
Bermuda international footballers
Bermudian footballers
Bermudian expatriate footballers
Association football midfielders
Bodens BK players
Dalkurd FF players
Stowmarket Town F.C. players
Braintree Town F.C. players
Ettan Fotboll players
Division 2 (Swedish football) players
2019 CONCACAF Gold Cup players
Expatriate footballers in Sweden
Bermudian expatriate sportspeople in Sweden
Thomas College alumni